Sanity: Aiken's Artifact is an action video game developed by Monolith Productions and published by Fox Interactive exclusively for Microsoft Windows. The game's lead character, Agent Nathaniel Cain, was voiced by Ice-T. A Dreamcast version had been in development, but it was eventually cancelled.

Gameplay
Sanity used a 3D engine to create a top-down view similar to Gauntlet.  Instead of weapons, the main character used various "psychic" abilities, called Talents, both offensive and defensive.  The abilities were represented by individual "cards"; the game shipped with a poster showing over 100 individual ability "cards".

The talents are categorized in to 8 different groups, or 'Totems' in which, each talent behaves like their respective totems. For example, Sun totem has Star blast, Star shower and Sand Pit abilities, which can be linked to the Sun. 

Each totem has a Shield ability, which were stronger from the top to bottom, the Shield of Truth being the strongest. There are a total of 80 Talents, which can be gathered along the span of the Single-player game. The multiplayer game has some more talents added to it.

"Booster Pack" expansion
Sanity: Aiken's Artifact had the option to purchase/download add-on various "booster packs" from Monolith's website to unlock additional in-game ability cards, a concept inspired by collectible card games such as Magic: The Gathering. Free "booster packs" were also included with various game magazine CD-ROMs shortly after the release of the game.

Plot
Several decades before the game starts, a world-renowned genetic engineer named Doctor Joan Aiken discovered a way to utilise the unused portion of the human brain via a serum. The serum would give the user psychic abilities, or "talents", which could manipulate the world around them, for example levitating or shooting a bolt of lightning. Talents were split into collections called totems, and each Psionic specialised in the use of one totem, others even founding their own. Aiken became the founder of the Science totem.

When the game starts, Cain has just been suspended from the DNPC following an incident with Priscilla Divine, leader of the Eye of Ra (a radical organisation who wish to destroy the CoT project for ethical reasons) and founder of the Sun totem. He is eventually recruited back and tasked with infiltrating the Eye of Ra, who have been operating under the guise of a psychic hotline, and apprehend Divine.

He returns to the DNPC to find that they are protecting another CoT, Bobby (no reason is given for this, but Bobby claims that it's because he has exceptional psionic powers). Abel breaks in and tries to kidnap Bobby, but Cain manages to hold him off until the DNPC arrive and use Talent - suppressors, forcing him to flee.

Cain is later told that a shipment of Aiken's test serum from when the labs tried to make the serum suitable for adults was stolen. The magician Adrian Starr, founder of the Illusion totem, is a suspect, and Cain is instructed to visit and question him. 

Once Elijah is dead, Cain leaves the mansion to be rewarded with a baseball bat over the head by one of the Bone Priest's men. Now, Cain must find the head and stop Golgotham from destroying it, or the Sanity Devourer will be called and consume the world.

Development
The game was announced at E3 2000 and was originally scheduled to release in late summer 2000.

Reception

The game received "average" reviews according to the review aggregation website Metacritic. Jim Preston of NextGen called it "A colorful game that starts out fun then slowly grows routine."

References

External links
 
 "Saturday Crapshoot: Sanity: Aiken's Artifact" from PC Gamer

2000 video games
Cancelled Dreamcast games
LithTech games
Monolith Productions games
Fox Interactive games
Video games about psychic powers
Video games developed in the United States
Video games featuring black protagonists
Windows games
Windows-only games